Kareela is a suburb in southern Sydney, in the state of New South Wales, Australia.

History
Kareela was the first mixed-use estate developed by Stockland, developed in 1953. The estate was originally called Sylvan Headland. Sylvan Headland changed to Kareela after the estate opened.  is derived from an Aboriginal word meaning 'place of trees
and water' or alternatively 'south wind' or 'wind rider'. The name for the suburb was approved by the Geographical Names Board in 1968. Most of the streets in Kareela are named after outright winners and line-honours winners of the Sydney to Hobart Yacht Race between 1945 and 1970.

Commercial area
Kareela had a small shopping centre, which as of 2013, has undergone major redevelopments. Formerly Kareela Shopping Centre; Kareela Village is a 14 million dollar project which was completed in 2015. The redevelopment includes the addition of specialty shops such as travel agent, medical centre, cafes, fashion shops, restaurants, fruitier, beauty & hair salons plus an early childhood learning centre and homewares as well as above and underground parking. Coles is the supermarket.

Population 
According to the 2016 Australian Bureau of Statistics Census of Population, there were 3,459 residents in Kareela. 76.8% of people were born in Australia. The next most common countries of birth were China 3.2% and England 3.1%. 79.3% of people spoke only English at home. Other languages spoken at home included Mandarin 3.4% and Greek 3.2%. The most common responses for religion were Catholic 29.4%, No Religion 24.1%, Anglican 21.2% and Eastern Orthodox 6.4%.

References

Suburbs of Sydney
Sutherland Shire